Matthew William Jay (born 27 February 1996) is an English professional footballer who plays as an attacking midfielder for Colchester United.

Early life and education
Jay was born in Torbay in Devon and he attended South Dartmoor Community College. He is related to the actress Sara Jay.

Playing career

Exeter City 

Jay made his professional debut for Exeter in a 2–0 loss to Wycombe Wanderers in the Football League Trophy at St James Park on 3 September 2013.

On 22 November 2015, Jay joined National League South side Hayes & Yeading United on a one-month loan.

He scored his first goal for Exeter in an EFL Trophy tie against Oxford United on 30 August 2016. 
Jay finally scored his first league goal on the 8th of April, in the 2017–18 campaign, away to Cambridge United in a game where Exeter came twice from behind to win 3–2. This came to the delight of many players and fans alike following a run of impressive games starting and from the bench.

In 2021, Jay scored his first career hat trick in a 4–0 victory against Leyton Orient. After a month in which he scored five goals and got one assist, Jay received the League Two Player of the Month award for March 2021. At the end of the 2020–21 season, he was named as the Devon side's Player of the Season, and on 29 April 2021 was named in the 2020–21 EFL League Two Team of the Season at the league's annual awards ceremony.

Jay was awarded the Exeter captaincy following the departure of Jake Taylor in the summer of 2021 and was given the number 7 shirt. He continued his goalscoring form into the 2021–22 season, netting 16 times in all competitions. The most significant of these came in a 2–1 home win over Barrow, where he scored a late winner, chesting the ball down from a Josh Key cross and slamming home through the legs of Paul Farman on the volley to secure his boyhood club's return to League One after a decade in League Two.

Colchester United 
On 9 January 2023, Jay signed for Colchester United for an undisclosed fee.

Career statistics

Honours
Exeter City
League Two runner-up: 2021–22

Individual
PFA Team of the Year: 2020–21 League Two, 2021–22 League Two
EFL League Two Team of the Season: 2020–21
Exeter City Player of the Season: 2020–21
League Two Player of the Month: March 2021

References

External links 

1996 births
Living people
English footballers
Footballers from Devon
Association football forwards
Exeter City F.C. players
Weston-super-Mare A.F.C. players
Hayes & Yeading United F.C. players
Truro City F.C. players
English Football League players
National League (English football) players
Colchester United F.C. players